Michael Antonio Britt (October 7, 1960 – December 25, 2017) was an American professional basketball player who was selected by the Washington Bullets in the second round (32nd overall) of the 1983 NBA draft. A 6'6" forward from the University of District of Columbia.

Dubbed the "Flying Pencil" by David Remnick of The Washington Post, as some scouts felt his slender frame was too lean for his height, Britt had a phenomenal freshman season at District of Columbia, averaged 24.3 points and 12.4 rebounds in 16 games with the Firebirds varsity. As a sophomore in the 1980–81 season, Britt was joined by 6'10" center Earl Jones, forming an explosive combination, and in 1982, Britt was named the outstanding player in the NCAA Division II tournament and the Firebirds won the championship with a 25–5 overall mark. 

Britt had his first taste of International competition at the Jones Cup in Taipei in 1982, An incoming senior that year, Britt combined forces with such stars as Chris Mullin and Aubrey Sherrod to power the United States to the championship under coach George Raveling. He was chosen by the Washington Bullets as their second round draft pick in 1983 but never played a game with the team. Britt joined the Louisville Catbirds of the Continental Basketball Association and later played for the Albuquerque Silvers of the same league. Britt split the 1983–84 season between the two teams, averaging 12.2 points and 4.7 rebounds in 40 games.

Britt died on December 25, 2017, at 57.

References

External links
thedraftreview.com
articles.dailypress.com
udcfirebirds.com

1960 births
2017 deaths
20th-century African-American sportspeople
Albuquerque Silvers players
African-American basketball players
American men's basketball players
Basketball players from Virginia
Gaiteros del Zulia players
Louisville Catbirds players
Small forwards
Sportspeople from Suffolk, Virginia
UDC Firebirds men's basketball players
Washington Bullets draft picks
American expatriate basketball people in the Philippines
Philippine Basketball Association imports
Great Taste Coffee Makers players